is a 2012 Japanese comedy horror film directed by Noboru Iguchi. The film involves Keiko (Rina Takeda) who is the daughter of a famous sushi chef. She leaves home for an inn where she is bullied by the president of Komatsu Pharmaceuticals. A Komatsu researcher arrives intent on revenge by creating a serum that turns fish on rice into killer sushi. Keiko teams up with the former sushi chef Sawada to fight off the creatures.

Production
Director and writer Noboru Iguchi decided to work on a film after the film Piranha 3D (2010) was popular in Japan. Iguchi was also influenced by the film Attack of the Killer Tomatoes by the idea of food attacking people. The film contains a number of action sequences which Iguchi said he wanted to be more comedic than his previous films. Yoshihiro Nishimura contributed to the special effects in the film.

Dead Sushi is the first film to be released from Walker Pictures, the new producing and distribution offshoot of the Japanese talent agency Office Walker.

Cast
Rina Takeda as Keiko
Shigeru Matsuzaki as Sawada 
Kentaro Shimazu as Yamada 
Asami Sugiura as Yumi Hanamaki 
Demo Tanaka 
 Takamasa Suga as Nosaka 
 Takashi Nishina as Mr. Hanamaki 
 Yui Murata as Miss Enomoto

Release
Dead Sushi had its world premiere at the Fantasia Festival on 22 July 2012.

Reviews
In a review for Dead Sushi and Zombie Ass: Toilet of the Dead, horror magazine Fangoria gave the film a 2 and a half rating out of four, stating that the film "kind of defy ratings; obviously they’re not high art, and the serious critic in me believes the score below is appropriate for these slight, outrageous confections. Yet they’re also diverting, raucous fun when seen in the company of like-minded viewers, so that rating can be augmented by half a skull (or more) if you’re able to watch these movies with a group". Variety gave the film a mixed review, noting that "the comic dialogue lacks zing and most perfs are pitched too high even for this type of nonsense, Takeda tones it down nicely and impressively kicks the butts of sleazy corporate types and seafood. Effects are super-cheesy; other tech work is passable."

References

External links
 

Japanese comedy horror films
Japanese splatter films
Martial arts horror films
Zombie comedy films
Films directed by Noboru Iguchi
2012 comedy horror films
2012 films
2012 comedy films
2012 horror films
2010s Japanese films
2010s Japanese-language films